Who Will Cut Our Hair When We're Gone? is the second and final studio album by Canadian indie rock band the Unicorns. It features several re-arranged versions of songs from their earlier self-released album Unicorns Are People Too. The album was first issued on CD and on vinyl in North America by Alien8 Recordings on October 21, 2003, and on CD in Europe by Rough Trade Records in 2004. It has since been repressed in limited quantities on pink and brown vinyl by Alien8 and was re-released on August 26, 2014 on the band's own label, Caterpillar Records.

The album received positive reviews both upon its release and in retrospective analyses, and it has been considered to be one of the best Canadian indie rock albums of all time.

Critical reception

The album received positive reviews. Shortly after its release, Eric Carr of Pitchfork wrote that "even at their goofiest, The Unicorns' level of comfort with their material-- and the obvious confidence that engenders-- makes it all seem totally natural and new". After its 2014 re-issue, Pitchfork'''s Stuart Berman called it "messy and often brilliant", writing that the album is "too complex to be classified as garage-rock, too unsettled to be psychedelic, too hooky to be described as art-damaged, and too fiercely funky to lapse into twee solipsism".

Adam Kivel of Consequence of Sound wrote that, throughout the album, "death and darkness haunt everything, even the cheeky synth tones and joyous guitars, but that shouldn't stop you from dancing". Justin Cober-Lake of PopMatters called the album "one of the year's most enjoyable", and Adam Lalama of Noisey wrote that it is "incontestably one of the coolest Canadian indie-rock albums of all time".

In popular culture
The album was briefly featured in the CBS sitcom How I Met Your Mother in the episode "Girls Versus Suits".

Track listing

2014 reissueWho Will Cut Our Hair When We're Gone? was reissued on 26 August 2014 to coincide with the band's brief reunion tour, ten years after their initial split. It features new artwork and includes four bonus tracks which are all previously unreleased other than "Evacuate the Vacuous" which appeared on The Unicorns: 2014. "Rocket Ship" is a cover of a song by Daniel Johnston, which is rumoured to have been recorded for the 2004 tribute album The Late Great Daniel Johnston: Discovered Covered''.

Personnel
Nick "Neil Diamonds" Thorburn and Alden "Ginger" Penner – vocals, drums, synthesizers, percussion, drum machine, toy piano, toy organ, echoplex, guitar, bass guitar, tape, recorder, glockenspiel, accordion
Jaime "J'amie Tambeur" Thompson – drums ("Tuff Ghost", "Jellybones", "I Was Born (A Unicorn)", "Inoculate the Innocuous", and "Les Os")
Brendan Reed – vocals ("I Was Born (A Unicorn)")
Richard Reed Parry – trumpet ("I Don't Wanna Die"); bowed bass on ("Sea Ghost"); additional recording assistance
Joellen Housego – fiddle ("Tuff Luff"); violin ("Let's Get Known")
Randy Peters – penny whistle ("Tuff Luff"); clarinet ("Let's Get Known")
Tim Kramer – cello ("Ready to Die")
Maxime Pellisier – clarinet ("Child Star")
Deanna Fong – vocals ("Les Os")
Recorded, mixed, and produced by Mark Lawson.

References

The Unicorns albums
2003 albums
Alien8 Recordings albums
Lo-fi music albums